The RNP world is a hypothesized intermediate period in the origin of life characterized by the existence of ribonucleoproteins. The period followed the hypothesized RNA world and ended with the formation of DNA and contemporary proteins. In the RNP world, RNA molecules began to synthesize peptides. These would eventually become proteins which have since assumed most of the diverse functions RNA performed previously. This transition paved the way for DNA to replace RNA as the primary store of genetic information, leading to life as we know it.

Principle of concept

Thomas Cech, in 2009, proposed the existence of the RNP world after his observation of apparent differences in the composition of catalysts in the two most fundamental processes that maintain and express genetic systems. The maintenance process, DNA replication and transcription, is accomplished purely by protein polymerases. The gene expression process, mRNA splicing and protein synthesis, is catalyzed by RNP complexes (the spliceosome and ribosome). 

The difference between how these processes catalyze can be reconciled with the RNA world theory. As an older molecule than DNA, RNA had a hybrid RNA-protein-based maintenance system. Our current DNA world could have resulted from the gradual replacement of RNA catalysis machines with proteins. In this view, ribonucleoproteins and nucleotide-based cofactors are relics of an intermediary era, the RNP world.

References

Ribonucleoproteins
RNA
DNA
Peptides
Proteins